The National Electronic Library (NEL) is a site funded by the Ministry of Culture of the Russian Federation, which provides Internet users with access to digitized books, newspapers and magazines in Russian libraries, museums and archives. National Electronic Library is a service that searches the full text of books and magazines that was scanned, converted to text using optical character recognition, and stored in its digital database. In 2015, the site posted 1,671,878 books. The site has a mobile application for iOS and Android

History 

In January 2003 the Russian State Library applied to the Ministry of Culture of Russia with the initiative to create an electronic library, and in February the National Library of Russia joined the project.

On December 17, 2008, the Russian State Library announced the completion of the project.

Since 2013, the Ministry of Culture has begun to develop the project, allocating funding for the creation of a technology platform, the purchase of copyright and the digitization of printed books.

See also 
 List of digital library projects
 Google Books

References

External links
 National electronic library

 

Full-text scholarly online databases
Scholarly search services
Computer-related introductions in 2004
Russian digital libraries